Samoana magdalinae, common name the "Polynesian tree snail", is a species of tropical, air-breathing land snail, a terrestrial, pulmonate, gastropod mollusc in the family Partulidae. This species is endemic to Fatu Hiva, French Polynesia.

References

M
Fauna of French Polynesia
Molluscs of Oceania
Taxobox binomials not recognized by IUCN